Metoprolol, sold under the brand name Lopressor, among others, is a selective β1 receptor blocker medication. It is used to treat high blood pressure, chest pain due to poor blood flow to the heart, and a number of conditions involving an abnormally fast heart rate. By working on the beta-1 receptor of the cardiac muscle cells, it yields both a chronotropic and inotropic effect.  It is also used to prevent further heart problems after myocardial infarction and to prevent headaches in those with migraines.

Metoprolol is sold in formulations that can be taken by mouth or given intravenously. The medication is often taken twice a day. The extended-release formulation, metoprolol succinate, is taken once per day. Metoprolol may be combined with hydrochlorothiazide (a diuretic) in a single tablet.

Common side effects include trouble sleeping, feeling tired, feeling faint, and abdominal discomfort. Large doses may cause serious toxicity. Risk in pregnancy has not been ruled out. It appears to be safe in breastfeeding. The metabolism of metoprolol can vary widely between patients, often as a result of hepatic impairment or CYP2D6 polymorphism. Care should be taken in patients with asthma; metoprolol should only be used in these patients when the benefits outweigh the risks, for example in heart failure. Stopping this drug should be done slowly to decrease the risk of further health problems.

Metoprolol was first made in 1969, patented in 1970, and approved for medical use in 1982. It is on the World Health Organization's List of Essential Medicines. It is available as a generic drug. In 2020, it was the sixth most commonly prescribed medication in the United States, with more than 66million prescriptions.

Medical uses 
Metoprolol is used for a number of conditions, including hypertension, angina, acute myocardial infarction, supraventricular tachycardia, ventricular tachycardia, congestive heart failure, and prevention of migraine headaches.  It is an adjunct in the treatment of hyperthyroidism.

The different salt versions of metoprolol – metoprolol tartrate and metoprolol succinate – are approved for different conditions and are not interchangeable.

Off-label uses include supraventricular tachycardia and thyroid storm.

Available forms
Metoprolol is sold in formulations that can be taken by mouth or given intravenously. The medication is often taken twice a day. The extended-release formulation, metoprolol succinate, is taken once a day. Metoprolol may be combined with hydrochlorothiazide (a diuretic) in a single tablet.

Adverse effects 

Adverse effects, especially with higher doses, include dizziness, drowsiness, fatigue, diarrhea, unusual dreams, trouble sleeping, depression, and vision problems. β-blockers, including metoprolol, reduce salivary flow via inhibition of the direct sympathetic innervation of the salivary glands. Metoprolol may also cause the hands and feet to feel cold. Due to the high penetration across the blood–brain barrier, lipophilic beta blockers such as propranolol and metoprolol are more likely than other less lipophilic beta blockers to cause sleep disturbances such as insomnia, vivid dreams and nightmares.

Serious side effects that are advised to be reported immediately include symptoms of bradycardia (resting heart rate slower than 60 beats per minute), persistent symptoms of dizziness, fainting and unusual fatigue, bluish discoloration of the fingers and toes and/or lips, numbness/tingling/swelling of the hands or feet, sexual dysfunction, erectile dysfunction, hair loss, mental/mood changes, depression, breathing difficulty, cough, dyslipidemia and increased thirst. Consuming alcohol while taking metoprolol may cause mild body rashes and is not advised.

Precautions 
It is well documented that metoprolol reduces long-term mortality and hospitalisation due to worsening heart failure. A meta-analysis further supports reduced incidence of heart failure worsening in patients treated with beta-blockers compared to placebo. However, in some circumstances, particularly when initiating metoprolol in patients with more symptomatic disease, an increased prevalence of hospitalisation and mortality has been reported within the first two months of starting. Patients should monitor for swelling of extremities, fatigue, and shortness of breath.

This medicine may cause changes in blood sugar levels or cover up signs of low blood sugar, such as a rapid pulse rate. It also may cause some people to become less alert than they are normally, making it dangerous for them to drive or use machines.

Greater care is required with use in those with liver problems or asthma. Stopping this drug should be done slowly to decrease the risk of further health problems.

Pregnancy and breastfeeding
Risk for the fetus has not been ruled out, per being rated pregnancy category C in the United States. Metoprolol is category C in Australia, meaning that it may be suspected of causing harmful effects on the human fetus (but no malformations). It appears to be safe in breastfeeding.

Overdose 
Excessive doses of metoprolol can cause severe hypotension, bradycardia, metabolic acidosis, seizures, and cardiorespiratory arrest. Blood or plasma concentrations may be measured to confirm a diagnosis of overdose or poisoning in hospitalized patients or to assist in a medicolegal death investigation. Plasma levels are usually less than 200 μg/L during therapeutic administration, but can range from 1–20 mg/L in overdose victims.

Pharmacology 

A general pharmacological description of the characteristics and activities of metoprolol includes:
 it is moderately lipophilic;
 it has weak membrane stabilizing activity;
 it is β1 adrenergic receptor-selective;
 it is without intrinsic sympathomimetic activity; and
 it decreases heart rate, contractility, and cardiac output, thereby decreasing blood pressure.

Mechanism of action 
Metoprolol blocks β1 adrenergic receptors in heart muscle cells, thereby decreasing the slope of phase 4 in the nodal action potential (reducing Na+ uptake) and prolonging repolarization of phase 3 (slowing down K+ release). It also suppresses the norepinephrine-induced increase in the sarcoplasmic reticulum (SR) Ca2+ leak and the spontaneous SR Ca2+ release, which are the major triggers for atrial fibrillation.

Pharmacokinetics 
Metoprolol undergoes α-hydroxylation and O-demethylation as a substrate of the cytochrome liver enzymes CYP2D6.

Chemistry 

Metoprolol was synthesized and its activity discovered by Bengt Ablad and Enar Carlsson in 1969. The specific agent in on-market formulations of metoprolol is either metoprolol tartrate or metoprolol succinate, where tartrate is an immediate-release formulation and the succinate is an extended-release formulation (with 100 mg metoprolol tartrate corresponding to 95 mg metoprolol succinate).

Stereochemistry 

Metoprolol contains a stereocenter and consists of two enantiomers. This is a racemate, i.e. a 1:1 mixture of (R)- and the (S)-form:

Regulatory status
Application by Validus Pharms for Lopressor (metoprolol tartrate), 50 and 100 mg tablet formulations, was first approved in the U.S. by the Food and Drug Administration (FDA) in August 1978. As of 2022, metaprolol formulations are FDA-approved in the U.S. for treatment of angina, heart failure, myocardial infarction, atrial fibrillation/flutter, and hypertension. Metaprolol is approved for use within the UK, with classification as a prescription-only drug in the beta blocker class, as regulated by the Medicines and Healthcare products Regulatory Agency (MHRA).

Off-label uses
Off-label uses include supraventricular tachycardia and thyroid storm.

Generic approvals

Metoprolol tartrate, a generic version of Lopressor, was licensed and authorized in June 1997 to Novartis Pharmaceuticals. In September 2011, the Medicines and Healthcare products Regulatory Agency (MHRA) granted the Intas Pharmaceuticals Limited marketing authorization (licences) for metoprolol tartrate (50 mg and 100 mg tablets) for medicinal prescription only; this was after it was established that there were no new or unexpected safety concerns and that the benefits of metoprolol tartrate were greater than the risks.

In sport
Because beta blockers can be used to reduce heart rate and minimize tremors, which can enhance performance in sports such as archery, Metoprolol is banned by the world anti-doping agency in some sports. Some bans, as in all forms of billiards, darts, and golf, apply during competition only. In others, such as riflery competition, any form of beta blocker is banned by the National Collegiate Athletic Association.

Urine tests are used to detect if beta blockers are present. Uncharged drugs and/or metabolites of beta blockers can be analysed by gas chromatography-mass spectrometry in selected ion monitoring (GC-MS-SIM). However, in modern times it is increasingly difficult to detect the presence of beta blockers used for sports doping purposes. A disadvantage to using GC-MS-SIM is that prior knowledge of the molecular structure of the target drugs/metabolites is required. Modern times have shown a variance in structures and hence novel beta blockers can go undetected.

Toprol XL suit
In the 2000s a lawsuit was brought against the manufacturers of Toprol XL (a time-release formula version of metoprolol) and its generic equivalent (metoprolol-succinate) claiming that to increase profits, lower cost generic versions of Toprol XL were intentionally kept off the market. It alleged that the pharmaceutical companies AstraZeneca AB, AstraZeneca LP, AstraZeneca Pharmaceuticals LP, and Aktiebolaget Hassle violated antitrust and consumer protection law.  In a settlement by the companies in 2012, without admission to the claims, they agreed to a settlement pay-out of US$ 11million.

Environmental presence

In 2021, metoprolol was one of the 12 compounds identified in sludge samples taken from 12 wastewater treatment plants in California that are otherwise associated with estrogenic activity in vitro.

References

Further reading

External links 
 

AstraZeneca brands
Beta blockers
Chemical substances for emergency medicine
CYP2D6 inhibitors
Isopropylamino compounds
N-isopropyl-phenoxypropanolamines
Novartis brands
World Health Organization essential medicines
Wikipedia medicine articles ready to translate